Zaleptus is a genus of harvestmen in the family Sclerosomatidae from Asia and Australia.

Species
 Zaleptus albimaculatus Roewer, 1955
 Zaleptus albipunctatus Suzuki, 1977
 Zaleptus annulatus (Thorell, 1889)
 Zaleptus annulipes Banks, 1930
 Zaleptus assamensis Roewer, 1955
 Zaleptus ater Suzuki, 1977
 Zaleptus auronitens (Roewer, 1955)
 Zaleptus auropunctatus Roewer, 1955
 Zaleptus aurotransversalis (Roewer, 1955)
 Zaleptus bicornigera (Roewer, 1911)
 Zaleptus bimaculatus (Thorell, 1889)
 Zaleptus biseriatus Roewer, 1910
 Zaleptus caeruleus Roewer, 1910
 Zaleptus cinctus Roewer, 1923
 Zaleptus cochinensis Roewer, 1955
 Zaleptus coronatus (Roewer, 1955)
 Zaleptus crassitarsus Suzuki, 1977
 Zaleptus cupreus (Roewer, 1912)
 Zaleptus cupreus (Roewer, 1912)
 Zaleptus diadematus (Thorell, 1891)
 Zaleptus festivus Thorell, 1889
 Zaleptus fuscus With, 1903
 Zaleptus gravelyi Roewer, 1955
 Zaleptus gravelyi (Roewer, 1912)
 Zaleptus gregoryi Roewer, 1955
 Zaleptus heinrichi (Roewer, 1955)
 Zaleptus heinrichi Roewer, 1955
 Zaleptus hoogstraali Suzuki, 1977
 Zaleptus indicus Roewer, 1929
 Zaleptus jacobsoni Roewer, 1923
 Zaleptus lugubris (Thorell, 1889)
 Zaleptus luteus Roewer, 1931
 Zaleptus lyrifrons Roewer, 1955
 Zaleptus marmoratus Roewer, 1910
 Zaleptus mertensi (Roewer, 1955)
 Zaleptus mjobergi (Banks, 1930)
 Zaleptus niger Roewer, 1955
 Zaleptus occidentalis Roewer, 1955
 Zaleptus ornatus Suzuki, 1977
 Zaleptus perakensis Roewer, 1955
 Zaleptus piceus Roewer, 1911
 Zaleptus popalus (Roewer, 1955)
 Zaleptus pretiosus Roewer, 1955
 Zaleptus pulchellus Banks, 1930
 Zaleptus quadricornis (Thorell, 1891)
 Zaleptus quadrimaculatus Suzuki, 1972
 Zaleptus ramosus Thorell, 1891
 Zaleptus richteri (Roewer, 1955)
 Zaleptus rufipes Roewer, 1955
 Zaleptus scaber (Roewer, 1910)
 Zaleptus scaber Roewer, 1936
 Zaleptus shanicus Roewer, 1955
 Zaleptus siamensis Roewer, 1955
 Zaleptus simplex Thorell, 1891
 Zaleptus spinosus Roewer, 1910
 Zaleptus splendens Roewer, 1911
 Zaleptus subcupreus Thorell, 1889
 Zaleptus sulphureus Thorell, 1889
 Zaleptus sumatranus (Roewer, 1955)
 Zaleptus thorellii With, 1903
 Zaleptus tluteus (Roewer, 1912)
 Zaleptus trichopus Thorell, 1876
 Zaleptus tricolor Roewer, 1955
 Zaleptus unicolor Roewer, 1923
 Zaleptus validus Roewer, 1955
 Zaleptus vanstraeleni Giltay, 1930
 Zaleptus vigilans (With, 1903)
 Zaleptus viridis Roewer, 1929
 Zaleptus werneri Suzuki, 1977
 Zaleptus yodai (Suzuki, 1966)
 Zaleptus yodo Roewer, 1955
 Zaleptus zilchi (Roewer, 1955)

References

Harvestmen
Harvestman genera